Synaphobranchus is a genus of eels in the cutthroat eel family, Synaphobranchidae. It currently contains the following species:

 Synaphobranchus affinis Günther, 1877 (Grey cutthroat eel)
 Synaphobranchus brevidorsalis Günther, 1887 (Shortdorsal cutthroat eel)
 Synaphobranchus calvus M. R. S. de Melo, 2007
 Synaphobranchus dolichorhynchus (E. H. M. Lea, 1913)
 Synaphobranchus kaupii J. Y. Johnson, 1862 (Kaup's arrowtooth eel)
 Synaphobranchus oregoni Castle, 1960

References

 

Synaphobranchidae